The Roman Catholic Diocese of Apartadó is a diocese located in the city of Apartadó in the Ecclesiastical province of Santa Fe de Antioquia in Colombia.

History
18 June 1988: Established as Diocese of Apartadó from the Diocese of Antioquía

Ordinaries
Isaías Duarte Cancino † (18 Jun 1988 – 19 Aug 1995) Appointed, Archbishop of Cali
Tulio Duque Gutiérrez, S.D.S. (18 Mar 1997 – 25 Jul 2001) Appointed, Bishop of Pereira
Germán Garcia Isaza, C.M. † (1 Mar 2002 – 11 Oct 2006) Died
Luis Adriano Piedrahíta Sandoval † (3 Jul 2007 – 5 May 2014) Appointed, Bishop of Santa Marta (Colombia)
Hugo Alberto Torres Marín (29 Sep 2015 - )

See also
Roman Catholicism in Colombia

Sources

External links
 GCatholic.org

Roman Catholic dioceses in Colombia
Roman Catholic Ecclesiastical Province of Santa Fe de Antioquia
Christian organizations established in 1988
Roman Catholic dioceses and prelatures established in the 20th century